Odigba (Òdìgbà) is the name for a bound collection of cylindrical beaded strings, collars, necklaces or rope accessories in the Yoruba culture. The word anatomy of the term comes from the article pieces: -Odi; i.e. The bound or tied, and -Igba; meaning collar or cord.

There are different types depending on their use or function. Those used by royals are more commonly known as Odigba Oba or Odigba ileke, while those used by Babalawo, diviners or priests are known by the name; Odigba Ifa.
The types of beads most commonly used in the stringing include glass, wood, and coral. Oftentimes, the materials from which an Odigba is made have ritual significances or represent important symbolisms such as 'longevity' and 'perpetuity'. They might also be infused / treated with various herbs and the pouches may contain potions which are believed to offer protective powers to the wearer.

They come in different shapes, forms and designs reflecting different tastes which varies across Yorubaland and areas influenced by Yoruba culture.

When used as accessories, the Odigba also signifies the importance, or heralds the status of the Oba or titled member of society wearing it. Originally, beaded objects or materials were the reserve for kings and other high-ranking members of society, most especially Ojoye/Ijoye (chiefs). However, the babalawo, who are seen in society as the fathers of mysteries, guardians of Yoruba esoteric knowledge and the conduit between the physical and the otherworldly can also own odigba, elevating their own political statuses by so doing.

An Odigba is not a single bead or collar but the collection of individual necklaces strung and held together into a larger piece. It might also come made with a long hanging pouch, bag or bags also made from beads or beautifully embroidered leather which would hang as a sash from one or both opposite sides of the torso or hip of the wearer in the form of a double cross strap.

References

Yoruba royalty
Yoruba culture
Yoruba words and phrases
Yoruba religion
Yoruba history
Divination
Yoruba art
Nigerian art